Bi Guanghuan (born 17 August 1997) is a Chinese footballer who plays for Chinese Super League side Guangzhou R&F.

Club career
Bi Guanghuan started his professional football career in August 2016 when he was loaned to Hong Kong Premier League side R&F, which was the satellite team of Guangzhou R&F. He made his senior debut on 16 October 2016 in a 4–1 home defeat against Yuen Long, coming on as a substitute for Ni Bo in the 74th minute.

Career statistics
Statistics accurate as of match played 10 January 2017.

1League Cups include Hong Kong Senior Challenge Shield, Hong Kong League Cup and Hong Kong Sapling Cup.

References

1997 births
Living people
Association football midfielders
Chinese footballers
Footballers from Guangzhou
Guangzhou City F.C. players
R&F (Hong Kong) players
Hong Kong Premier League players